International Institute of Rural Reconstruction, also known as IIRR is a non-profit organization that helps empower rural communities by making them self-sufficient. By offering programs across health, education, environment and livelihood, its goal is to have rural communities take charge of their own success. The organization has delivered programs to more than 40 countries in Asia, Africa and Latin America and directly impacted the lives of over 5 million people as of 2019.

Headquarters
The Y.C. James Yen Center occupies an area of 54 hectares along the boundary of the municipality of Silang and the City of Dasmariñas in the province of Cavite, Philippines. It includes a number of classrooms, function halls, apartments, and hostels.

Additionally, the organization has country offices in Cambodia, Myanmar, Ethiopia, Kenya, South Sudan, Uganda, United States, and Zimbabwe.

Origins of the Rural Reconstruction Movement

The origins of the movement can be traced back to China in the 1930s, during the Great Depression in China. Individuals living in rural China, many of them landless, were particularly hurt by the global economic downturn. The declining agricultural and rural economy caused severe social unrest in the countryside. Intellectuals and reformers such as Liang Shuming, Y.C. James Yen, Tao Xingzhi, Lu Zuofu and Peng Yuting
turned their attention to the countryside and initiated the first wave of the Rural Reconstruction movement in order to experiment with various rural development models. Liang Shuming and James Yen were prominent figures in the movement.

Liang Shuming emphasized the merger of traditional Chinese beliefs and values with new agricultural and technological advances. He funded the Research Institute of Rural Reconstruction in Zouping county of Shandong province to disseminate his theories of development. The organization trained thousands of rural educators in remote and previously under-served rural communities. It also helped to introduce new agricultural technology and hybridized plants to these communities.

James Yen, unlike Liang, received a western education at Hong Kong and later Yale University and worked for a time in France. He believed that education was the primary tool in empowering the poor. He therefore supported educational reforms in the Chinese countryside, where most people lived. Yen summarized China's rural problems as peasants' ignorance, poverty, illness and selfishness. The remedy to these problems thus relied on mass education with respect to culture, livelihood, health care and civic mindedness. Yen and his colleagues committed to reduce the illiteracy rate in the countryside and teach farmers science and new technologies. They also edited and published a farmers' newspaper and established a farmers' radio and performance group to promote local literature, art and theater.

Both Liang and Yen's projects were halted by the Sino-Japanese War of 1937. Yen would take his educational movement abroad to other developing nations in Asia, Africa, and Latin America. In 1960 Yen founded the International Institute of Rural Reconstruction in the Philippines.

The Yen Center
The  campus is nestled in a wide range of fauna and flora and is the home of the International Institute of Rural Reconstruction. The facility offers seminars, training, retreats, workshops, conferences, team building, and other learning events.

Accommodation
The Yen Center offers low carbon accommodations in a rural setting with green landscapes designed to cater to group-specific requirements. Furnished bungalow-type cottages with green sustainable operating practices are also available for family and small group events.

Facilities and Services
The Yen Center has three fully equipped function halls and several break-out rooms and reflection huts. The Yen Center also offers an array of dishes from international menus to local favorites and own recipes are even produced using campus garden produce.

Eco-friendly Environment
The campus-style environment is well suited for outdoor activities such as camping, bird-watching and nature trekking. Other sites on the campus include learning centers that focus on IIRR's work and projects.

Livelihood Learning Sites
The Sustainable Livelihood Demo Sites focuses on agro-forestry and features an integrated farm replete with a fodder garden, composting sites, and various livelihood options such an indigenous swine and poultry productions. The George Sycip Bio-Intensive Garden (BIG) Learning Center, a demonstration center growing of indigenous vegetables and other planting materials, displays IIRR's climate-smart agro-ecological practices. Other Livelihood Learning Sites include the Youth Development Program Learning Center, the International School for Sustainable Tourism and the Philippine Rural Reconstruction Movement Farm.

Bio-Intensive Gardening (BIG)
BIG programs have been particularly useful in urban areas where traditional agricultural methods are untenable. Bio-intensive urban gardens, in addition to the emphasis on enhanced nutritional quality of the food produced, adds a concern with food safety, given the increasing commercialization of vegetables from high input peri-urban and truck farming systems.

Bio-Intensive Gardening (BIG) was first developed in 1984 in response to a collapse of the Philippine sugar industry and a subsequent economic crisis. By 1986 the rate of malnutrition in the province of Negros Occidental, where BIG was first implemented, had fallen from 25% to 40%.  BIG and similar programs can be found in Bangladesh, Cambodia, Guatemala, India, Indonesia, Kenya, Laos, Nepal and Thailand.

Bio-Intensive Gardens provide organic nutritious food as well as a source of income for the individuals that cultivate them. In the Philippine city of Cagayan de Oro, 25% of produce cultivated with BIG techniques are eaten by the cultivator and their family. The remaining 75% is sold to neighbors and walk-in clients. 75% of cultivators double their vegetable consumption in a city where vegetable intake is only 36 kg per capita per year, half of the FAO recommended minimum.

Training programs and projects

Training programs
IIRR offers a diverse pool of community-led training programs:
Participatory monitoring and Evaluation
Sustainable Agriculture Training of Trainers
Training Program Development and Management
Systems in Community-managed Health
Farmer-Led Extension or Participatory Approaches to Agricultural Extension
Rural Development Management
Development Communication
Gender in Program Development and Management
Financial Sustainability for NGOs
Community-based Integrated Watershed Management
Regenerative agriculture
Food Security Through Home Gardening
Small-Scale and Community-based Aquaculture
NGO Leadership, Development and Social Change
Participatory Action Research for Community-based Natural Resources Management

Projects
IIRR has also implemented the following projects related to capacity development:

Sustainable Agriculture Training of Trainers Projects: A 5-year project funded by the Dutch government (DGIS) to develop capacities of IIRR and core partner organizations on trainings for sustainable agriculture.

Mekong Learning Initiative: An on-going project in the Mekong in collaboration with select organizations including Pakse Agricultural College and Participatory Development Training Center (PADETC) in Laos, Can Tho University in Vietnam, World Fish and Oxfam America. The aim is to develop capacities of local organizations in the Mekong Region towards participatory natural resource management.
Lashi Watershed Management: A short-term project engaged with Oxfam America to develop capacities of stakeholders in watershed management.
Training and technical accompaniment to Cordia Medan and Caritas Sibolga of Indonesia on Community Managed Disaster Risk Reduction (CMDRR)
Capacity Development Program for the Asia Zone Emergency and Environment Network (AZEECON): A 3-year program where IIRR provides capacity-development support for members of the Asia Zone Emergency and Environment Network (AZEECON) to build and strengthen their capacities to facilitate community-level climate change work.

Programs
NGO Disaster Preparedness Program (NGODPP): To address disaster relief, recovery and resilience building
Leyte Sab-a Peatland Forest Restoration Initiative: To address peat swamp forest degradation, biodiversity loss and climate change

People
Juan Flavier
Francis M. Ssekandi
Y. C. James Yen

See also
Philippine Rural Reconstruction Movement
PROLINNOVA

References

Organizations based in Cavite
Ramon Magsaysay Award winners
Silang, Cavite